Josefa Benítez Guzman (born 30 August 1969 in Barcelona) is a cyclist from Spain.

Personal 
In 2013, Benítez was awarded the silver Real Orden al Mérito Deportivo.

Cycling 
Benítez competed at the 2012 Summer Paralympics. She finished second in the road race.

From the Catalan region of Spain, she was a recipient of a 2012 Plan ADO scholarship.

References

External links 
 
 

Spanish female cyclists
Living people
1969 births
Paralympic silver medalists for Spain
Cyclists at the 2012 Summer Paralympics
Cyclists from Barcelona
Plan ADOP alumni
Medalists at the 2012 Summer Paralympics
Paralympic medalists in cycling
Paralympic cyclists of Spain
21st-century Spanish women